Onslow Bay is an indentation of the North Carolina coast, between Cape Fear in the south and Cape Lookout in the north. Thirteen barrier islands form the shore of the bay. It is part of the open Atlantic Ocean and affords no protection from oceanic swells.

External links 
 Description of Onslow Bay Coastal Climatology

Bays of North Carolina
Bodies of water of Brunswick County, North Carolina
Bodies of water of Carteret County, North Carolina